Husham Mohammed Fayadh Al-Dulaimi  (simply known as Husham Mohammed, born 10 May 1974 in Ramadi, Iraq) is a former Iraqi football striker who last played for  Al-Karkh in Iraq.

He made his debut for Iraq in 1998. After never been given an opportunity in an Iraqi jersey by former coaches Najih Humoud and Milan Zivadinovic, Husham was thrown a lifeline by Adnan Hamad who gave him a starting place against Macao ahead of regular striker Qahtan Chathir alongside Sabah Jeayer. He took his chance scoring 5 goals in the game helping Iraq to an 8-0 trashing over their group rivals.

International goals
Scores and results list Iraq's goal tally first.

Coaching career

Zakho FC

Mohammed began his coaching career as an assistant to the Libyan Abdul-Hafeedh Arbeesh in Zakho FC club, Arbeesh got sacked after 2 months. Mohammed stayed in the club as an assistant to the new coach Ali Hadi.

References

External links
 Profile on goalzz

Association football forwards
Iraqi footballers
Iraq international footballers
Living people
Iraqi expatriate footballers
Al-Zawraa SC players
Al-Talaba SC players
Al-Karkh SC players
2000 AFC Asian Cup players
People from Ramadi
1974 births